Ania Movie is the fourth studio album by Polish singer Ania, released in 2010.

Background 
The album consists of cover versions of Ania's favourite movie and TV series themes, including music from MASH, About a Boy, Across 110th Street or Deep Throat II. The album was officially confirmed as the last retro-oriented record in Ania's discography. Ania Movie was initially to be released on 22 March, but due to technical problems the date was postponed.

It debuted at #1 position in Polish albums chart and went Platinum in Poland. The album was promoted by Ania Movie Tour.

Track listing 
 "Bang Bang (My Baby Shot Me Down)" (Sonny Bono) - 3:38
 "Everybody's Talkin'" (Fred Neil) - 3:44
 "Give Me Your Love" (Curtis Mayfield) - 3:22
 "Across 110th Street" (Bobby Womack, Peace) - 3:55
 "Suicide Is Painless" (Mike Altman, Johnny Mandel) - 2:57
 "Silent Sigh" (Badly Drawn Boy) - 8:22
 "Strawberry Fields Forever" (John Lennon, Paul McCartney) - 5:08
 "Deeper and Deeper" (Tony Bruno) - 4:18
 "Sound of Silence" (Paul Simon) - 4:47

Singles 
 2010: "Driving All Around"
 2010: "Suicide Is Painless"
 2010: "Bang Bang"
 2010: "Silent Sigh"

References 

2010 albums
Ania (singer) albums
Covers albums